Lev Arkadyevich Tcelishchev (born 16 April 1990) is a Russian handball player who plays for Spartak Moscow and the Russian national team.

He competed at the 2016 European Men's Handball Championship.

References

1990 births
Living people
Russian male handball players
HC Motor Zaporizhia players